The 2021 Campeonato Goiano (officially the Campeonato Goiano de Profissionais da 1ª Divisão – Edição 2021) was the 78th edition of Goiás's top professional football league organized by FGF. The competition began on 28 February 2021.

The competition counted with the return of Itumbiara and Jataiense (teams promoted from the 2020 Campeonato Goiano da Divisão de Acesso) that occupied the two places of the two 2020 relegated teams. Atlético Goianiense were the defending champions but they were eliminated in the semi-finals.

Due to the worsening of the COVID-19 pandemic in Brazil, the Government of Goiás suspended the Campeonato Goiano between 16 and 30 March 2021. The tournament resumed on 31 March 2021, and ended on 23 May 2021.

Tied 2–2 on aggregate, Grêmio Anápolis defeated Vila Nova on penalties 5–4 winning the Campeonato Goiano for the first time.

Participating teams

Format
In the first stage, the 12 teams were drawn into two groups of six teams each.

Each group was played on a home-and-away round-robin basis. The teams were ranked according to points. If tied on points, the following criteria would be used to determine the ranking: 1. Wins; 2. Goal difference; 3. Goals scored; 4. Head-to-head points 5. Fewest red cards; 6. Fewest yellow cards; 7. Draw. This criteria (except 4) also was used to determine the overall performance in the final stages.

The top four teams of each group advanced to the quarter-finals while the bottom team was relegated to 2022 Campeonato Goiano da Divisão de Acesso.

The final stages were played on a home-and-away two-legged basis. For the semi-finals and finals the best overall performance team hosted the second leg. If the score was level, a penalty shoot-out would be used to determine the winners.

Champions qualified for the 2022 Copa do Brasil and 2022 Copa Verde, while runners-up and third place only qualified for the 2022 Copa do Brasil. Top three teams not already qualified for 2022 Série A, Série B or Série C qualified for 2022 Campeonato Brasileiro Série D.

First stage

Group A

Group B

Final stage

Bracket

Quarter-finals

|}

Group C

Atlético Goianiense advanced to the semi-finals

Group D

Aparecidense advanced to the semi-finals

Group E

Grêmio Anápolis advanced to the semi-finals

Group F

Vila Nova advanced to the semi-finals

Semi-finals

|}

Group G

Grêmio Anápolis advanced to the finals

Group H

Vila Nova advanced to the finals

Finals

|}

Matches

General table

Top goalscorers

References

2021 in Brazilian football leagues
Campeonato Goiano seasons
Campeonato Goiano